Irwin Belk (April 4, 1922 – February 24, 2018) was an American businessman and politician.

Belk was born in Charlotte, North Carolina. He went to The McCallie School and Davidson College. In 1946, Belk received his bachelor's degree from University of North Carolina at Chapel Hill. Belk served in the United States Army Air Forces during World War II. He worked for Belk, a department store chain founded by his father William Henry Belk, and served as former CEO. Under his leadership, Belk Inc. became the largest, privately owned department store chain in the United States. Belk served in the North Carolina House of Representatives from 1959 to 1962 and the North Carolina Senate from 1963 to 1966. Belk was a Democrat. In 1999, President Bill Clinton appointed Belk as an alternative delegate to the United Nations.

Notes

1922 births
2018 deaths
Businesspeople from Charlotte, North Carolina
Politicians from Charlotte, North Carolina
United States Army Air Forces soldiers
Military personnel from North Carolina
Davidson College alumni
University of North Carolina at Chapel Hill alumni
Democratic Party members of the North Carolina House of Representatives
Democratic Party North Carolina state senators
United States Army Air Forces personnel of World War II
20th-century American businesspeople